Un Príncipe de la iglesia ("A Prince of the Church") is a 1952 Mexican film. It stars Carlos Orellana.

Cast
Ernesto Alonso
Armando Arriola
Jose Baviera
Lilia del Valle
Maria Douglas
Carlos Orellana
Charles Rooner
Wolf Ruvinskis
Domingo Soler
Julio Villarreal
Fernando Wagner

External links
 

1952 films
1950s Spanish-language films
Mexican drama films
1952 drama films
Mexican black-and-white films
Films directed by Miguel M. Delgado
1950s Mexican films